Antun Najžer, also known by the hypocorism Ante Najzer, was a Croatian physician and member of the fascist Ustaše movement who served as the commander of the Sisak children's concentration camp in the Independent State of Croatia during World War II. He was dubbed the "Croatian Mengele" by survivors due to conducting medical experiments on his victims. For these crimes, in September 1946 he was sentenced to execution by a firing squad.

References

People from Sisak
Croatian physicians
Croatian people of World War II
Croatian people convicted of war crimes
Ustaše concentration camp personnel
Holocaust perpetrators in Yugoslavia
Genocide of Serbs in the Independent State of Croatia perpetrators
Croatian people convicted of crimes against humanity
Croatian fascists
Croatian irredentism
Executed Yugoslav collaborators with Nazi Germany
Anti-Serbian sentiment
Persecution of Eastern Orthodox Christians
People executed by Yugoslavia by firing squad
Year of birth missing
Date of birth missing
Place of birth missing
Year of death missing
Date of death missing
Place of death missing